Charles F. Jeff Sullivan (October 10, 1904 – August 24, 1962) was an American politician who served as the 57th Lieutenant Governor for the Commonwealth of Massachusetts from 1949 to 1953. Sullivan was also a member of the Worcester, Massachusetts Common Council, a member of the Massachusetts House of Representatives, a Massachusetts State Senator and the Mayor of Worcester, Massachusetts from 1946 to 1949.

Early life
Sullivan was the ninth of fifteen children born to Timothy and Mary Sullivan. When he was seven years old, Sullivan was nicknamed Jeff by a childhood friend who did not like the names Charles or Charlie. He eventually legally changed his name to Charles F. Jeff Sullivan. He dropped out of high school to work as an errand boy for the Reed and Prince Manufacturing Company. He earned extra money by selling lunches to his co-workers, which led to him opening a lunch cart.

On September 3, 1928 he married Helen Norma McMahon. They had three daughters.

Entry into politics
At the age of thirty, Sullivan went into politics, he was first elected to the Worcester, Massachusetts Common Council in 1935, this was followed by election to the Massachusetts House of Representatives in 1937 and to the Massachusetts Senate in 1940.

Election as Mayor of Worcester
Sullivan first ran for Mayor in 1943, however he lost that election to the Republican candidate William Bennett.  Sullivan ran again for the Mayoralty in 1945, this time he was elected.  Sullivan he was sworn into the office of Mayor at the age of 41.

Mayoral term
During his term as mayor Sullivan worked to develop the new Worcester Airport, blacktop the city's streets, covering up the old streetcar tracks that were no longer in use and to clean up the city's pension system.  Sullivan was reelected mayor in 1948 and he served until 1949 when Worcester changed its city government to a Plan E format, under which the mayor is no longer popularly elected but is instead selected by votes of the City Council.

Lieutenant Governor of Massachusetts

On November 3, 1948 Sullivan was elected as Lieutenant Governor of Massachusetts, he was also reelected as mayor of Worcester and until 1949 he served in both capacities.

Sullivan was reelected a lieutenant governor in 1950 of Massachusetts, he ran for reelection in 1952, however he lost in the Republican landslide of that year.

Post political career
Sullivan retired from politics and opened up a liquor store.

Sullivan died on August 24, 1962.

See also
 Massachusetts legislature: 1941–1942, 1943–1944, 1945–1946

References

Further readingy
 Commonwealth of Massachusetts, 1945-1946 Public officers of the Commonwealth of Massachusetts, page 72, (1945).
 Commonwealth of Massachusetts, 1949-1950 Public officers of the Commonwealth of Massachusetts, page 23, (1949).

	

1904 births
Lieutenant Governors of Massachusetts
Businesspeople from Massachusetts
Mayors of Worcester, Massachusetts
Worcester, Massachusetts City Council members
Massachusetts state senators
Members of the Massachusetts House of Representatives
1962 deaths
20th-century American businesspeople
20th-century American politicians